The Greatest Dancer is a British dance competition television series created by Simon Cowell and produced by Syco Entertainment. The first BBC programme created by Cowell, The Greatest Dancer sees previously undiscovered dance acts perform live weekly for Cheryl, Oti Mabuse, Matthew Morrison and Todrick Hall (the "Dance Captains") and a studio audience in a competition to win £50,000 and a chance to perform on Strictly Come Dancing.

The first series aired on BBC One on Saturdays from 5 January to 23 February 2019, and was won by 14-year-old solo dancer Ellie Fergusson from Livingston, West Lothian, who was mentored by Oti Mabuse. A second series premiered on 4 January 2020, with the addition of Todrick Hall to the judging panel, and Curtis Pritchard replaced Amelia Wilson as the receptionist. The series ran until 7 March 2020, when it was won by Latin and ballroom dancers Michael and Jowita, also mentored by Mabuse. On 28 April 2020, the BBC announced that were no plans for any further series of The Greatest Dancer.

Series overview
Series 1: 5 January – 23 February 2019 (8 episodes)
Auditions: 5–26 January 2019
Live shows: 2–23 February 2019
Series 2: 4 January 2020 – 7 March 2020 (10 episodes)
Auditions: 4–25 January 2020
Live shows: 1 February–7 March 2020

Judges:
 Dancer in Team Oti
 Dancer in Team Matthew
 Dancer in Team Cheryl
 Dancer in Team Todrick

Format
A non-televised pilot for the show was filmed in February 2018 at Hammersmith Apollo in London.

Auditions 
The auditions for the first series took place at ICC Birmingham in August of the previous year and were divided into three episodes in 2019, and four in 2020, airing each Saturday. Auditioning acts were allowed to consist of any number of members, and each person participating was required to be at least 7 years old. Each auditioning act performed in front of a one-way mirror and each audience member had a light to turn on during each audition that they liked; only acts for whom at least 75 percent of the audience turned on their lights would qualify for the callbacks. The format was adapted from the Israeli television music competition franchise Rising Star. In the second series, at the end of each audition show, one Dance Captain chose their 'Greatest Dancer Of The Day', an act of their choice which advances straight to the live shows.

Callbacks 
The callbacks aired as a separate show in 2019, and immediately after the fourth round of auditions in 2020. From the acts that had qualified for the callbacks, the Dance Captains each selected three to join their team (or two in the second series as they had each already chosen a 'Greatest Dancer Of The Day' for their team previously).

Live Challenge 
Each Saturday, the final acts performed to stay in the competition. Each act was assigned a different challenge, which they had to incorporate into their performance. Much like the auditions, each audience member had a light to turn on during each performance that they liked. After all acts had performed, the public were given the opportunity to vote for their favourite acts. Either one or two acts were voted off each week, eventually leaving four to compete in the final show.

Final 
Each of the four acts in the final firstly perform a collaboration with their respective Dance Captain, and the act that received the fewest votes from the public finished in fourth place. The three remaining acts then each performed a reprise of the dance they performed in the auditions stage. The act that received the most votes from the public was crowned the winner and received £50,000 and a chance to perform on the next series of Strictly Come Dancing.

Series 1 (2019)

Live show details

Acts

Week 1 (2 February)
Group performance: "The Greatest" with Dance Captains
Guest performance: Freya Ridings ("Lost Without You") with Rambert Dance Company

Week 2 (9 February)
Guest performance: Years & Years ("Play") with BalletBoyz

Week 3: Semi-final (16 February)
Guest performance: The professional cast of Strictly Come Dancing and the Dance Captains

Week 4: Final (23 February)
Guest performance: Jess Glynne ("I'll Be There") with breakdance crew The Ruggeds

Dance 1: Performance with Dance Captain (one act eliminated)
Dance 2: Reprise of audition dance

Series 2 (2020)

The second series started on 4 January 2020. In a change from last year, at the end of each week a different coach was chosen to pick an act from that week to join their team. The choices were as follow:

Auditions

Week 1
Cheryl was selected to choose a Greatest Dancer of the Day.

Week 2
Todrick Hall was selected to choose a Greatest Dancer of the Day.

Week 3 
Matthew Morrison was selected to choose a Greatest Dancer of the Day.

Week 4

Oti Mabuse was selected to choose a Greatest Dancer of the Day.

The Final 12

Live Challenge Shows

Challenge Show 1  
Theme: Best of British

Challenge Show 2
Theme: Props

Challenge Show 3
Theme: Around the World

Challenge Show 4 (Quarter-Final)
Theme: Dance Fusion

Challenge Show 5 (Semi Final)
Theme: Coaches' Pick

Final

Dance 1: Performance with Dance Captain (one act eliminated)
Dance 2: Reprise of favourite dance

Judges, receptionist and presenters

Overview

Key
 Presenter of The Greatest Dancer
 Receptionist of The Greatest Dancer
 Dance Captain of ''The Greatest Dancer

-

Presenters
On 19 July 2018, it was announced that Alesha Dixon and Jordan Banjo would host the programme.

Dance panel
On 10 August 2018, it was announced that the show's Dance Captains were Cheryl, Matthew Morrison and Oti Mabuse. For the 2020 series, dancer Todrick Hall joined as the fourth Dance Captain.

International versions
The format has been sold to broadcasters in China, Denmark, Spain and Belgium (North and South).

References

External links

2019 British television series debuts
2020 British television series endings
2010s British reality television series
2020s British reality television series
English-language television shows
BBC high definition shows
BBC reality television shows
Dance competition television shows
Television series by Fremantle (company)